TBD may refer to:

Arts and media
 TBD (TV network), an American broadcast television network for millennials
 TBD TV (now WJLA 24/7 News), a local cable news channel for Washington, D.C.
 TBD Records, an American record label 
 TBD.com, a defunct news website for Washington, D.C.
 "T.B.D.", a song by Live from Throwing Copper
 Three Busy Debras, an American comedy television series

Military
 Douglas TBD Devastator, a WWII torpedo aircraft
 Torpedo boat destroyer, the forerunner to the modern naval destroyer
 Track-before-detect, a radar detection method

Other uses 
To be determined, or "to be decided" or "to be declared".
Triazabicyclodecene, a chemical compound
 Three Bridges railway station, Sussex, England (by GBR code)
 Timbiqui Airport, Cauca, Colombia (by IATA code)

See also
 TBA (disambiguation)